Annick Cousin (born August 7, 1973) is a French politician of the National Rally who was elected as a Member of the National Assembly for Lot-et-Garonne's 3rd constituency in 2022.

Cousin was born in 1973 and raised in Agen. She was an employee of the district hospital of Agen before working in politics and is married to a fellow  National Rally member. In 2021, she was elected as a regional councilor in Lot-et-Garonne. She succeeded Hélène Laporte as the regional RN leader in Lot-et-Garonne that same year.

During the 2022 French legislative election, Cousin was elected to represent Lot-et-Garonne's 3rd constituency succeeding Olivier Damaisin.

References

1973 births
Living people
21st-century French politicians
21st-century French women politicians
National Rally (France) politicians
Deputies of the 16th National Assembly of the French Fifth Republic
Women members of the National Assembly (France)